There Are Things You Don't Know is a 2010 film starring Ali Mosaffa, Leila Hatami, and Mahtab Keramati. The movie was directed by Fardin Saheb-Zamani, and the screenplay was written by Fardin Saheb-Zamani and Payam Yazdani.

Plot
The film tells the story of a reclusive taxi driver in Tehran in the days leading up to an earthquake. He has chosen to distance himself from society and to be passive so as not to be hurt. Finally one of his passengers gives him enough motivation to act and bring about a change in his life.

Cast
Ali Mosaffa

Leila Hatami

Mahtab Keramati

Mona Mostofi

Nasim Amir Khosro

Mehdi Agahi

Siamak Adib, Mohamad Nazimi Arani, Mostafa Sasani, Soren Menatsakian, Vahid Hasanzadeh, Farnaz Rahnema, Mohamad Rabbanipour, Mehdi Bajestani, Payam Yazdani, Mhdieh Mir Habibi, Maral Irandoost, Hesam Nourani, Effat Rasoulinejad, Mitra Moradi, Karina Nazarava

Awards
Special Jury Mention, Karlovy Vary International Film Festival, 2010.

References

External links

Archive of Karlovy Vary Film Festival
There Are Things You Don't Know at Museum of Fine Arts, Boston
Juliet Sherwood review at denverfilm.com
Alissa Simon review at variety.com

Iranian drama films
2010 films
2010s Persian-language films
Films directed by Manijeh Hekmat